Hookdale is an unincorporated community in Bond County, Illinois, United States. Hookdale is southeast of Greenville.

References

Unincorporated communities in Bond County, Illinois
Unincorporated communities in Illinois